The 4th National People's Congress was in session from 1975 to 1978. It held only one session, in January 1975. There were 2864 deputies to this Congress.

The Congress passed the 1975 Constitution of the People's Republic of China.

Elected state leaders
President and Vice President: Posts abolished
Chairman of the Standing Committee of the National People's Congress: Zhu De
Premier of the State Council: Zhou Enlai
President of the Supreme People's Court: Jiang Hua

Highlights
The posts of President of China and Vice President were abolished in 1975, according to the suggestion of Chairman Mao Zedong.  This was part of the Chinese Cultural Revolution, which ended in 1976.

External links
 Official website of the NPC

National People's Congresses
1975 in China